Mike Lohmann (born 6 June 1954) is a former international speedway rider from Denmark.

Speedway career 
Lohmann won a gold medal at the Speedway World Team Cup in the 1978 Speedway World Team Cup. The following year he won a silver medal at the 1979 Speedway World Team Cup.

He rode in the top tier of British Speedway from 1976 to 1981, riding for Halifax Dukes and Belle Vue Aces. He was also the 1974 Danish Junior Champion.

World final appearances

World Team Cup
 1978 -  Landshut, Stadion Ellermühle (with Ole Olsen / Hans Nielsen / Finn Thomsen) - Winner - 37pts (9)
 1979 -  London, White City Stadium (with Ole Olsen / Hans Nielsen / Finn Thomsen / Bo Petersen) - 2nd - 31pts (6)

References 

1954 births
Danish speedway riders
Belle Vue Aces riders
Halifax Dukes riders
Living people
Sportspeople from the Capital Region of Denmark